George Theodore Koch (July 2, 1919 – September 5, 1966) was an American football halfback who played two seasons with the Cleveland/Los Angeles Rams of the National Football League (NFL). He first enrolled at Baylor University before transferring to St. Mary's University, Texas. He attended Temple High School in Temple, Texas. Koch was also a member of the Buffalo Bills of the All-America Football Conference (AAFC).

Professional career
Koch played for the Cleveland/Los Angeles Rams of the NFL from 1945 to 1946. He played in thirteen games, starting three, for the AAFC's Buffalo Bills during the 1947 season.

References

External links
Just Sports Stats

1919 births
1966 deaths
Players of American football from Texas
American football halfbacks
American football defensive backs
Baylor Bears football players
St. Mary's Rattlers football players
Cleveland Rams players
Los Angeles Rams players
Buffalo Bills (AAFC) players
People from Temple, Texas
Temple High School (Texas) alumni